Water intoxication, also known as water poisoning, hyperhydration, overhydration, or water toxemia, is a potentially fatal disturbance in brain functions that results when the normal balance of electrolytes in the body is pushed outside safe limits by excessive water intake.

Under normal circumstances, accidentally consuming too much water is exceptionally rare. Nearly all deaths related to water intoxication in normal individuals have resulted either from water-drinking contests, in which individuals attempt to consume large amounts of water, or from long bouts of exercise during which excessive amounts of fluid were consumed. In addition, water cure, a method of torture in which the victim is forced to consume excessive amounts of water, can cause water intoxication.

Water, just like any other substance, can be considered a poison when over-consumed in a brief period of time. Water intoxication mostly occurs when water is being consumed in a high quantity without adequate electrolyte intake.

Excess of body water may also be a result of a medical condition or improper treatment; see "hyponatremia" for some examples. Water is considered one of the least toxic chemical compounds, with an LD50 exceeding 90 ml/kg in rats; drinking 6 liters in three hours has caused the death of a human.

Risk factors

Low body mass (infants)
It can be very easy for children under one year old (especially those under nine months) to absorb too much water. Because of their small body mass, it is easy for them to take in a large amount of water relative to body mass and total body sodium stores.

Endurance sports
Marathon runners are susceptible to water intoxication if they drink too much while running. This is caused when sodium levels drop below 135 mmol/L when athletes consume large amounts of fluid. This has been noted to be the result of the encouragement of excessive fluid replacement by various guidelines. This has largely been identified in marathon runners as a dilutional hyponatremia. A study conducted on runners completing the 2002 Boston Marathon found that thirteen percent finished the race with hyponatremia. The study concluded that the strongest predictor of hyponatremia was weight gain while racing (over-hydration), and hyponatremia was just as likely to occur in runners who chose sports drinks as those who chose water.

Military training
Hyponatremia and other physical conditions associated with water intoxication are more often seen in those participating in military training. One US Army study found 17 trainees were admitted to hospital over a year's period for water intoxication while another found that three soldiers had died, leading to a recommendation that no more than 1-1.5L of water should be consumed per hour of heavy sweating.

Overexertion and heat stress
Any activity or situation that promotes heavy sweating can lead to water intoxication when water is consumed to replace lost fluids. Persons working in extreme heat and/or humidity for long periods must take care to drink and eat in ways that help to maintain electrolyte balance. People using drugs such as MDMA (often referred to colloquially as "Ecstasy") may overexert themselves, perspire heavily, feel increased thirst, and then drink large amounts of water to rehydrate, leading to electrolyte imbalance and water intoxication – this is compounded by MDMA use increasing the levels of antidiuretic hormone (ADH), decreasing the amount of water lost through urination. Even people who are resting quietly in extreme heat or humidity may run the risk of water intoxication if they drink large amounts of water over short periods for rehydration.

Psychiatric conditions
Psychogenic polydipsia is the psychiatric condition in which patients feel compelled to drink large quantities of water, thus putting them at risk of water intoxication. This condition can be especially dangerous if the patient also exhibits other psychiatric indications (as is often the case), as the care-takers might misinterpret the hyponatremic symptoms.

Iatrogenic
When an unconscious person is being fed intravenously (for example, total parenteral nutrition) or via a nasogastric tube, the fluids given must be carefully balanced in composition to match fluids and electrolytes lost. These fluids are typically hypertonic, and so water is often co-administered. If the electrolytes are not monitored (even in an ambulatory patient), either hypernatremia or hyponatremia may result.

Some neurological/psychiatric medications (oxcarbazepine, among others) have been found to cause hyponatremia in some patients. Patients with diabetes insipidus are particularly vulnerable due to rapid fluid processing.

Pathophysiology 
At the onset of this condition, fluid outside the cells has an excessively low amount of solutes, such as sodium and other electrolytes, in comparison to fluid inside the cells, causing the fluid to move into the cells to balance its osmotic concentration. This causes the cells to swell. The swelling increases intracranial pressure in the brain, which leads to the first observable symptoms of water intoxication: headache, personality changes, changes in behavior, confusion, irritability, and drowsiness. These are sometimes followed by difficulty breathing during exertion, muscle weakness & pain, twitching, or cramping, nausea, vomiting, thirst, and a dulled ability to perceive and interpret sensory information. As the condition persists, papillary and vital signs may result including bradycardia and widened pulse pressure. The cells in the brain may swell to the point where blood flow is interrupted resulting in cerebral edema. Swollen brain cells may also apply pressure to the brain stem causing central nervous system dysfunction. Both cerebral edema and interference with the central nervous system are dangerous and could result in seizures, brain damage, coma or death.

Prevention 

Water intoxication can be prevented if a person's intake of water does not grossly exceed their losses. Healthy kidneys are able to excrete approximately 800 millilitres to one litre of fluid water (0.84–1.04 quarts) per hour. However, stress (from prolonged physical exertion), as well as disease states, can greatly reduce this amount.

Treatment
Mild intoxication may remain asymptomatic and require only fluid restriction. In more severe cases, treatment consists of:
 Diuretics to increase urination, which are most effective for excess blood volume.
 Vasopressin receptor antagonists

Notable cases
 1097: During the First Crusade, according to at least one chronicle, many crusaders died after drinking too much from a river while marching to Antioch.
1991, Andy Warhol: Five years after his death, Warhol's family publicly accused the hospital where he had his gallbladder removed of causing his death by water intoxication administered post-operatively.
 November 16, 1995: Leah Betts, a British schoolgirl, died as the result of drinking too much water, though in the media her death was mistakenly attributed to taking an ecstasy tablet at her 18th birthday party.
 2003: British actor Anthony Andrews survived a case of water intoxication. He was performing as Henry Higgins in a revival of the musical My Fair Lady at the time, and consumed up to eight litres of water a day. He was unconscious and in intensive care for three days.
February 2, 2005: Matthew Carrington, a student at Chico State University in Chico, California, died as a direct result of a fraternity hazing ritual involving forced water intoxication.
January 12, 2007: Jennifer Strange died after drinking nearly 2 gallons (7.6 liters) of water in an attempt to win a Nintendo Wii. The KDND radio station's morning show, the Morning Rave, held an on-air contest entitled "Hold Your Wee for a Wii," in which contestants were asked to drink as much water as they could without urinating. The DJs were made aware of the dangers but did not inform the contestants. KDND's parent company, Entercom Sacramento LLC, was subsequently ordered to pay $16,577,118 in damages to Strange's family.
 March 11, 2020: Zachary Sabin, an 11-year-old child, died after being forced to drink almost three liters of water in just four hours by his parents. They thought his urine was too dark, so they made him drink water until he threw up.

See also

 Dehydration
 Drowning
 Hyperkalemia / Hypokalemia
 Hypermagnesemia / Hypomagnesemia
 Hypernatremia / Hyponatremia
 Gastroenteritis
 Oral rehydration therapy
 Polydipsia
 Water urticaria
 Dihydrogen monoxide hoax
 Electrolyte imbalance
 List of unusual deaths
 Potomania
 The dose makes the poison

References

Body water
Electrolyte disturbances
Intoxication
Substance intoxication
Suicide methods